Alexander Vasilyevich Maslyakov (born November 24, 1941 in Sverdlovsk, USSR) is a prominent Soviet and Russian television game show host.  He is a well known, iconic figure throughout the former USSR, having been on the screen for the greater part of most people's lives. Since 1964, the leader and presenter of the TV show «KVN». In this he compares with personalities such as Bob Barker or Dick Clark on American television.

Game shows
Maslyakov has been working in television since 1964.  He has hosted numerous game shows in this time, including «Allo, my ishchem talanty» [Hello, we're looking for talents], «Adresa molodykh» [Addresses of young ones], «Veselye rebyata» [Fun kids], the long-running «A nu-ka, devushki» [Come on, girls], in which young women competed against one another in  skills such as cooking, dancing, or milking cows, and its short-lived counterpart for young men, «A nu-ka parni».  He was also the first host (1974) of what subsequently became one of Russia's longest-running game shows, «Chto? Gde? Kogda?» [What? Where? When?].

Maslyakov was the regular host of Soviet coverage of World Festivals of Youth and Students, held in such major world capitals as Sofia, Havana, (East) Berlin, Pyongyang, and Moscow, as well as hosting a number of popular Soviet Eurovision-style lip-synching song competitions over the years.

KVN 

Maslyakov is most famous, however, for his involvement in the game show KVN (Club of the happy and inventive), a game show nearly as long-lived as «Chto? Gde? Kogda?», in which teams of enthusiastic and clever young people (usually university students) compete against one another in a series of improvised and rehearsed comedic and musical skits and witty repartee (and occasionally cutting-edge politically risque satire and social commentary) in front of a live audience and a jury of stars of stage and screen.  KVN went on the air in 1961, and Maslyakov became its host in 1964, while still a student himself.  He has remained at the helm ever since, and now runs the production company that owns the show itself and all spinoff rights.  Maslyakov is currently the president of the International Union of KVN and the host of all the games of the Major League of KVN as well as of the annual KVN festivals in Sochi and Jūrmala.

Education and awards
Maslyakov graduated in 1966 from the Moscow Institute of Transport Engineers and in 1968 he completed Higher Courses for Television Workers.  He is a Merited Figure of the Arts of the Russian Federation, 1994 laureate of the Ovation prize, and a member of the Academy of Russian Television.  In 2002 he was awarded the highest honor of the Academy of Russian Television, the TEFI  For individual contribution to the development of domestic television.  In 2006, in commemoration of the 45th anniversary of KVN, the then-president of the Russian Federation conferred the Order of Merit for the Fatherland Grade IV on Maslyakov for a significant contribution to the development of domestic television and many years of creative activity.

References

External links
 Official KVN website

Living people
1941 births
People from Yekaterinburg
Russian television personalities
KVN
Soviet television presenters
Full Cavaliers of the Order "For Merit to the Fatherland"
Russian media executives